Fisheries Research is a peer-reviewed academic journal on fisheries science published by Elsevier since 1982. The journal is abstracted and indexed in the Science Citation Index, Scopus, Biosis, Academic Search Premier, and PASCAL. According to the Journal Citation Reports, the journal has a 2014 impact factor of 1.903.

References

External links 
 

English-language journals
Elsevier academic journals
Publications established in 1982
Hybrid open access journals
Agricultural journals